Holt–Frost House, also known as the Dr. Frost House, is a historic home located at Burlington, Alamance County, North Carolina. It is a two-story, "L"-shaped, Queen Anne style dwelling.  It has a rear one-story wing that may date to 1860. It has a slate gable roof, multi-colored glass window panels, porches, and an abundance of sawn and turned millwork.

It was added to the National Register of Historic Places in 1984.

References

Houses on the National Register of Historic Places in North Carolina
Queen Anne architecture in North Carolina
Houses completed in 1860
Buildings and structures in Burlington, North Carolina
National Register of Historic Places in Alamance County, North Carolina
Houses in Alamance County, North Carolina